Jessica Hagy is known for the online cartoon Indexed which is a collection of charts and diagrams hand drawn on 3x5 index cards and organized into a blog format. She has compiled her cartoons into a book called Indexed. The cartoon has also appeared in Freakonomics, Plenty, Good Magazine, and BBC.co.uk. Indexed was voted by readers on Time.com as the best blog of 2008.

Books
Cartoon Compilations

Indexed,  2008, 
"How To Be Interesting", 2013, 
"The Humanist's Devotional", 2019 
 "the art of war 2016",

References

External links
 Indexed Cartoon

Living people
Year of birth missing (living people)